The 21st Ankara International Film Festival is a film festival held in Ankara, Turkey that ran from March 11 to 21, 2010.

This edition of the Ankara International Film Festival, organized by The World Mass Media Research Foundation and accredited by FIPRESCI, opened with a gala on the evening of March 10 at the Presidential Symphony Orchestra Concert Hall, at which the foundation special awards were presented, and closed with a screening of The Dust of Time directed by Theodoros Angelopoulos.

11 films competed in the National Feature Competition, 28 films competed in the National Short Film Competition under fiction, experimental and animation categories and 17 films competed in the National Documentary Film Competition under amateur and professional categories. The festival films were shown at three venues, including Batı Movie Theaters, German Cultural Center and Çankata Municipality Contemporary Arts Center with the final awards being given out in a ceremony held at the Presidential Symphony Orchestra Concert Hall.

Among the filmmakers who were present to present their films at the festival were Siddiq Barmak, Aslı Özge and Aku Louhimies.

Awards

Foundation special awards
 Aziz Nesin Endeavour Award: Turkish actress Filiz Akın
 Mass Media Award: NTV culture and art programme Gece Gündüz produced and presented by Yekta Kopan
 Oak of Art Award: Turkish poet Gülten Akın

National feature film competition awards
 Best Film Award: Men on the Bridge directed by Aslı Özge
 Best Movie Director Award: Pelin Esmer for 10 to 11
 Best Leading Actor Award: Mert Fırat for Love in Another Language 
 Best Leading Actress Award: Saadet Işıl Aksoy for Love in Another Language 
 Best Supporting Actor Award: Volga Sorgu for Black Dogs Barking
 Best Supporting Actress Award: Selen Uçar for A Step into the Darkness
 Best Screenplay Award: Pelin Esmer for 10 to 11
 Cinema Writers Association Best Film Award: Black Dogs Barking directed by Mehmet Bahadır Er and Maryna Gorbach
 Mahmut Tali Öngören Special Award: On the Way to School directed by Orhan Eskiköy and Özgür Doğan

National documentary film competition awards
 Best Documentary Film Award: Prison No 5: 1980–1984 directed by Çayan Demirel
 Runner-up: The Children of September directed by Meltem Öztürk and Hülya Karcı

National Programmes

National Feature Film Competition

Films in Competition
 10 to 11 directed by Pelin Esmer.
 Black Dogs Barking directed by Mehmet Bahadır Er and Maryna Gorbach.
 How Are You? directed by Özlem Akovalıgil.
 Love in Another Language directed by İlksen Başarır.
 Men On The Bridge directed by Aslı Özge.
 On the Way to School directed by Orhan Eskiköy.
 The Pain directed by Cemal Şan.
 Piano Girl directed by Murat Saraçoğlu.
 The Ringing Ball directed by M. Egemen Ertürk.
 A Step into the Darkness directed by Atıl İnaç.
 There directed by Hakkı Kurtuluş and Melik Saraçoğlu.

Out of Competition Screenings
 The Hopeless directed by Yılmaz Güney.
 The Crab Game directed by Ali Özgentürk.

National Documentary Film Competition

National Documentary Film Competition Jury
 Hakan Aytekin
 Hacı Mehmet Duranoğlu
 Yaprak İşçibaşı
 Özgür Şeyben
 Mutlu Binark

Amateur Films in Competition
 Baghdad directed by Berrak Samur
 On the Coast directed by Merve Kayan and Zeynep Dadak
 The Silence Time directed by Çiğdem Mazlum and Sertaç Yıldız
 The Wall directed by Emre Karadaş and Deniz Oğuzsoy
 A Fatal Dress: Polygamy directed by Müjde Arslan
 The Song Of Romeyika directed by Yeliz Karakütük
 The Cling directed by Musa Ak
 The Colors of Zilan directed by Nagihan Çakar

Professional Films in Competition
 Prison No 5: 1980–1984 directed by Çayan Demirel
 The Children of September directed by Meltem Öztürk and Hülya Karcı
 Bullet and Pen directed by Mustafa Ünlü
 Lady Mukhtar directed by Didem Şahin
 Miraz directed by Rodi Yüzbaşı
 An Argonaut in Ordu directed by Rüya Arzu Köksal
 Silicosis directed by Ethem Özgüven, Petra Holzer and Selçuk Erzurumlu
 The Last Season: Shawaks directed by Kazim Öz
 Coffee Futures directed by Zeynep Devrim Gürsel

Out of Competition Screenings
 4857 directed by Ethem Özgüven, Petra Holzer and Selçuk Erzurumlu
 Thoughts on the Cinema of Halit Refiğ directed by Çetin Tunca.
 Istanbul Is Naked directed by Zafer Biçen.
 Leyla and Mecnun Abroad directed by Zeynep Özkaya.
 Memduh Ün: Big World Of Small People directed by Çetin Tunca.
 The Losers directed by Gül Büyükbeşe Muyan.
 Passion of Metin Erksan directed by Sadık Battal.

International Programmes

Power and Rebellion
Power and Rebellion was selected as the basic theme of the festival in order, according to the organisers, to bring up the need for an uprise to the public agenda of the public, and because, In an era of uncertainty and abdication like today, we all need to watch these films and then think about our future once again.

 The Commute directed by Elías León Siminiani.
 Rabbit à la Berlin directed by Bartosz Konopka.
 Living on Your Feet: The Struggles of Cipriano Mera directed by Valentí Figueres.
 Confessions of an Economic Hitman directed by Stelios Kouloglou.
 Kavalar - The White Zone directed by Ralf Küster.
 Stammheim directed by Reinhard Hauff.
 If.... directed by Lindsay Anderson.
 Burn! directed by Gillo Pontecorvo.
 Red Psalm directed by Miklós Jancsó.
 United Red Army directed by Kôji Wakamatsu.
 Rosa Luxemburg directed by Margarethe von Trotta.
 Entranced Earth directed by Glauber Rocha.
 Viva Maria! directed by Louis Malle.

Masters
The Masters programme exhibited new works by the world's most established and renowned filmmakers such as Robert Guédiguian, Theodoros Angelopoulos, Costa-Gavras, Michael Haneke.

 Achilles and the Tortoise directed by Takeshi Kitano.
 The White Ribbon directed by Michael Haneke.
 Eden Is West directed by Costa-Gavras.
 Rembrandt's J'Accuse...! directed by Peter Greenaway.
 The Army of Crime directed by Robert Guédiguian.
 The Dust of Time directed by Theodoros Angelopoulos.

From All Over the World
From All Over the World was a collection of premieres and prize-winning film selections which aims to present the best of current international filmmaking.

 Opium War directed by Siddiq Barmak.
 Backyard directed by Carlos Carrera.
 Tales from the Golden Age directed by Hanno Höfer, Razvan Marculescu, Cristian Mungiu, Constantin Popescu & Ioana Uricaru.
 The Last Days of Emma Blank directed by Alex van Warmerdam.
 The Investigator directed by Attila Gigor.
 Johnny Mad Dog directed by Jean-Stéphane Sauvaire.
 Mary and Max directed by Adam Elliot.
 Metropia directed by Tarik Saleh.
 Breathless (Korean: Ddongpari) directed by Yang Ik-june.
 Tears of April directed by Aku Louhimies.
 The Other Bank directed by George Ovashvili.
 Letters to Father Jaakob directed by Klaus Härö.
 Revanche directed by Götz Spielmann.
 Samson and Delilah directed by Warwick Thornton.

A Country: Brazil
A Country: Brazil was a lineup of 7 films, which aims to highlight the renaissance Brazilian Cinema has undergone in the 2000s.

 The Year My Parents Went on Vacation directed by Cao Hamburger.
 Brainstorm directed by Luiz Bolognesi.
 Estamira directed by Marcos Prado.
 BirdWatchers directed by Marco Bechis.
 Estômago: A Gastronomic Story directed by Marcos Jorge.
 Elite Squad directed by José Padilha.
 Cinema, Aspirins and Vultures directed by Marcelo Gomes.

In Memoriam: Eric Rohmer
In Memoriam: Eric Rohmer was a selection of two films screened in memory of the new wave auteur Eric Rohmer, who died that year.
 Pauline at the Beach directed by Eric Rohmer.
 The Green Ray directed by Eric Rohmer.

Immortals at Cinema's Century
Immortals at Cinema's Century was a selection of four films screened to celebrate Akira Kurosawa’s 100th and Luis Buñuel’s 110th birthday.
 The Criminal Life of Archibaldo de la Cruz directed by Luis Buñuel.
 Simon of the Desert directed by Luis Buñuel.
 Yojimbo directed by Akira Kurosawa.
 Throne of Blood directed by Akira Kurosawa.

Midnight Cinema
Midnight Cinema was a late night screenings of the most bizarre films of the horror and thriller genres.

 Mom directed by Andres Muschietti.
 Dead Snow directed by Tommy Wirkola.
 Deadspiel directed by Jay Molloy.
 Full Employment directed by Thomas Oberlies & Matthias Vogel.

Afghan Dreams
 Addicted in Afghanistan directed by Jawed Taiman.
 Afghan Chronicles directed by Dominic Morissette.
 Yelda - The Longest Night directed by Roberto Lozano.

State of the World

 Painful Years directed by Anne-Mieke van den berg.
 The Heretics directed by Joan Braderman.
 The Real World Of Peter Gabriel directed by Georg Maas & Dieter Zeppenfeld.
 Listening to The Silence directed by Pedro Flores.
 Tobacco Girl directed by Biljana Garvanlieva.

See also 
 2010 in film
 Turkish films of 2010

External links
  for the festival

References

Ankara International Film Festival
Ankara International Film Festival
Ankara International Film Festival 21st
Festivals in Ankara
2010s in Ankara